ʻAbd al-Majīd (ALA-LC romanization of ) is a Muslim male given name and, in modern usage, surname. It is built from the Arabic words ʻabd and al-Majīd, one of the names of God in the Qur'an, which give rise to the Muslim theophoric names. It means "servant of the All-glorious". It is rendered in Turkish as Abdülmecid.

There is a distinct but closely related name, ʻAbd al-Mājid, with a similar meaning, formed on the Qur'anic name al-Mājid. Some of the names below are instance of the latter one.

'Abd al-Majid may refer to:

Males

Given name
Abdülmecid I (1823–1861), Sultan of the Ottoman Empire
Abdülmecid II (1868–1944), Head of the Ottoman Imperial House and the final Ottoman Caliph
Abdul Madzhid (Dagestan rebel) (died 2008), leader in the Second Chechen War
Abdul Majeed (cricketer, born 1993), Pakistani cricketer
Abdul Majeed (Kalat cricketer), Pakistani cricketer
Abdul Majid (physicist), Pakistani astrophysicist
Abdel Meguid Amir (born 1961), Egyptian basketball player
Abdelmajid Benjelloun (1919–1981), Moroccan novelist, journalist and ambassador
Abdelmajid Benjelloun (historian) (born 1944), Moroccan author, historian and poet
Abdelmajid Bourebbou (born 1951), Algerian footballer
Abdelmajid Bouyboud (born 1966), Moroccan footballer
Abdelmajid Chetali (born 1939), Tunisian footballer
Abdelmajid Dahoumane (born 1967), Algerian alleged terrorist
Abdul Majid Daryabadi (1892–1977), Indian Muslim writer and exegete of the Qur'an
Abdul Majeed Didi (1873–1952), Sultan of the Maldives
Abdelmajid Dolmy (born 1953), Moroccan footballer
Abdulmajid Dostiev, Tajik diplomat
Abdelmajid Eddine (born 1979), Moroccan footballer
Abdul Majid Giaka (born 1960), Libyan double-agent for the CIA
Abdul Majid Hassan (ca. 1380–1408), Sultan of Brunei
Abd el-Majid Hidr, original name of Amos Yarkoni (1920–1991), Israeli Arab soldier
Abdul Majid Khan (born 1953), Afghan held in Bagram
Abdul-Majid al-Khoei (1962–2003), Iraqi Twelver cleric
Abdul Majeed Khwaja (1885–1962), Indian lawyer, educationist, social reformer and freedom fighter
Abdul Majid Kubar (born 1909), Libyan politician
Abdelmadjid Mada (born 1953), Algerian runner
Abdul Majid Mahmoud (born 1979), Pakistani held in Guantanamo
Abdol Majid Majidi (1928–2014), Iranian politician 
Abdol Majid Mirza (1845–1927), Qajar prince and Prime Minister of Iran
Abdul Majid Muhammed (born 1978), Iranian held in Guantanamo
Abdelmajid Oulmers (born 1978), Moroccan footballer
Abdul Majid al-Qa′ud (born 1943), Libyan politician
Abdul Majid Rouzi, Afghan soldier
Abdelmajid Saleh, Lebanese politician
Abdul Majid Samim, Afghan politician
Abdul Majeed bin Abdulaziz Al Saud (1942–2007), Saudi prince
Abdelmadjid Tahraoui (born 1981), Algerian footballer
Abdol Majid Taleqani (–1771/2), Iranian calligrapher
Abdelmadjid Tebboune, President of Algeria
Abdul Majid Zabuli (1896–1998), Afghan banker
'Abd al-Majid Nimer Zaghmout (died 2000), Palestinian imprisoned in Syria
Abdul Majeed al-Zindani (born 1942), Yemeni academic and politician

Surname
Ahmed Asmat Abdel-Meguid (born 1923), Egyptian diplomat
Ali Hassan Abd al-Majid al-Tikriti, or just Ali Hassan al-Majid (1941–2010), Iraqi politician
Atif Abdelmageed
Bassam Abdel Majeed (born 1950), Syrian politician
Chaudhry Abdul Majeed (died 2006), Pakistani nuclear physicist
Chaudhry Abdul Majid, Pakistani Kashmiri politician
Hussein 'Abd al-Majid (disappeared 1936), Iraqi, Saddam Hussein's father
Khalid ‘Abd al-Majid, Palestinian politician
M. N. Abdul Majeed (born 1957), Sri Lankan politician
Munshi Abdul Majid (born 1952), Afghan politician
Qazi Abdul Majeed Abid, Pakistani politician
S. M. Abdul Majid, Indian politician
Shah Abdul Majid Qureshi, Bangladeshi restaurateur and social reformer
Syed Abdul Majid (1872-1922), Bengali lawyer, politician and entrepreneur
Tun Habib Abdul Majid (1637–1697), Bendahara of the Johor Sultanate
Tunku Abdul Majid (born 1970), Tunku Bendahara of Johor

Females
Iman Mohamed Abdulmajid, or Iman (model), (born 1955), Somali-American model, actress and entrepreneur

See also
"Heroes" (David Bowie album), a David Bowie album including an instrumental piece named "Abdulmajid" as a bonus track on its 1991 reissue
Abdulmajidia, genus of Malayan plants

References

Arabic masculine given names
Iranian masculine given names
Turkish masculine given names